Wardell can refer to:

People
 Brigadier Michael Wardell (1895 – 1978), a British-born army officer and publisher
Wardell (band), an indie folk band
 Wardell Curry I or Dell Curry (born 1964), American retired basketball player
 Wardell Curry II or Stephen Curry (born 1988), American basketball player, son of Dell Curry
 Brad Wardell, computer and video game designer
 Gareth Lodwig Wardell, British politician
 William Wardell, Australian architect
 Wardell, a Team SoloMid member

Places
 Wardell, Missouri, United States
 Wardell, New South Wales, Australia

See also
Wardell House (disambiguation)
Wardle (disambiguation)